Merliidae is a family of sponges belonging to the order Merliida.

Genera:
 Merlia Kirkpatrick, 1908

References

Sponge families